Kalp may refer to:
 KALP, a radio station in Alpine, Texas
 Malcolm Kalp, hostage in the Iran hostage crisis
 "Üç Kalp", a pop song from Turkish girl group Hepsi
 Kalpa (time)

See also 
 Kalpa (disambiguation)
 Kalb (disambiguation)